This is a list of universities in Panama.

University of Panama
ABAB University
University of Swahili
Technological University of Panama
TECH Technological University
Universidad Católica Santa María La Antigua
West Coast University - Panama
Polytechnic University of Central America
Florida State University-Panama
ISAL institute

Universities in Panama City

Universidad Americana (Panama)
Universidad del Isthmo
Universidad Hosanna
Quality Leadership University
Universidad Midrasha Jorev
Interamerican University of Panama
Universidad Hispanoamericana de Panama
Universidad Latinoamericana de Comercio Exterior
Universidad Euroamericana
Universidad Internacional de Ciencia y Tecnología
Commonwealth University

 
Universities
Panama
Panama